Luigi Taramazzo (May 5, 1932 – February 15, 2004) was a racing driver from Italy.  His single Formula One World Championship entry was at the 1958 Monaco Grand Prix, where he shared the Maserati 250F of Ken Kavanagh.  Neither driver qualified the car, so Taramazzo did not start the race.

Complete Formula One World Championship results
(key)

References

Italian racing drivers
Italian Formula One drivers
1932 births
2004 deaths
People from Ceva
Sportspeople from the Province of Cuneo